The Biberkopf is a 2,599 m high mountain in the Alps on the border between Germany and Austria.

Location and area 
The Biberkopf lies on the main crest of the Allgäu Alps on the border between the Bavarian district of Oberallgäu and the Tyrolean district of Reutte. It is around 15.5 km south-southwest of Oberstdorf and only about 2.5 km east of the Schrofen Pass.

The Biberkopf is sometimes described as the most southerly point in Bavaria and Germany, although its summit lies 110 metres further north than the Haldenwanger Eck, 4,088 metres to the west.

Geology 
Its fascinating shape makes the Biberkopf (literally: "beaver's head") one of the most striking mountains in the German Alps. Geologically the body of the summit is made of severely folded dolomite that was thrust up over marls. The very pure dolomite is the reason for the lack of vegetations on the mountain, because the content of clay minerals in the weathering products is insufficient for the formation of soil. By contrast, in the areas on marl strata there is a rich flora.

Ascent 
From the Rappensee Hut and from Lechleiten (near Warth) marked routes run up the Biberkopf. These take about 2.5 to 3 hours. Both ascents cross exposed sections of steep rock and scree, which is why sure-footedness is required. Due to the installation of wire cables and other climbing aids the climbs may be attempted by less able climbers (UIAA grade I). An ascent is not advisable in wet weather or conditions of snow and ice. Patches of snow remain year-round on the northern slopes. The routes to the summit are maintained by the German Alpine Club's branch at Obergünzburg, which belongs to the section at Kempten/Allgäu.

The south face of the Biberkopf was first climbed in 1922 by the Allgäu alpinist, Hermann Grosselfinger.

Gallery

Sources and maps 
Dieter Seibert, Alpenvereinsführer Allgäuer Alpen und Ammergauer Alpen, Munich 2004, 
Alpenvereinskarte 1:25,000, Sheet3/2, Lechtaler Alpen, Arlberggebiet (The Biberkopf is right on the northern edge of the map, the Rappensee Hut is off the map)
Bayerisches Landervermessungsamt, 1:50.000, Sonderdruck Allgäuer Alpen, Blatt UK L8

External links 

 The Biberkopf

Two-thousanders of Germany
Mountains of the Alps
Allgäu Alps
Mountains of Bavaria
Mountains of Tyrol (state)
Two-thousanders of Austria